The Parson's Handbook is a book by Percy Dearmer, first published in 1899, that was fundamental to the development of liturgy in the Church of England and throughout the Anglican Communion.

The 19th-century Oxford Movement brought the high church within the Church of England into a place of confident leadership of the mainstream of the church. By the end of that century, many were struggling to find suitable forms of worship that were at once obedient to the letter of the Book of Common Prayer (if not its intention) and reflected the desire to a return to more Catholic forms of ritual and ceremonial. Some in the church took on board much of the ritual of the Tridentine Mass. Dearmer and other members of the Alcuin Club decried this wholesale adaptation of Italianate forms, and they campaigned for a revived English Catholicism that was rooted in pre-Reformation ritual, especially in the Sarum Use – something they termed the Anglican Use or English Use. The Parson's Handbook is Dearmer's brotherly advice to fellow churchmen about the correct way to conduct proper and fitting English worship. Dearmer's writing style is strong: he disparages customs he finds quaint or misguided, and makes good use of his subtle wit. Although Dearmer's directions would have originally been considered high church, the popularity of the handbook has made them normative. This norm has been influential throughout those portions of the Anglican Communion that have been open to the development of a more Catholic ritual. Although the handbook now appears somewhat dated, and many Anglican provinces have adopted more modern liturgies than the single Book of Common Prayer of Dearmer's age, his work remains surprisingly useful in the modern context.

The handbook was first published by Grant Richards in 1899. Oxford University Press published their first edition in 1907. The twelfth edition was published in 1932, four years before Dearmer's death. The final, 13th edition was extensively revised and rewritten by Cyril Pocknee, a former pupil of Dearmer's.

Chapter headings 
The chapter headings according to the 13th revised edition are:

 Some Liturgical Principles
 The Christian Altar and its Furnishings
 The Chancel and Nave and their Furniture
 Vestments and Vesture, including Episcopal Insignia and Liturgical Colours
 The Ornaments of the Church
 Vestries
 Matins and Evensong
 Processions, including the use of the Litany
 The Holy Communion: (1) Introduction
 The Holy Communion: (2) Solemn Eucharist or High Mass
 The Holy Communion: (3) Priest and Clerk; a plain Celebration
 The Rites of Christian Initiation: Baptism, Confirmation, and First Communion
 The Solemnization of Holy Matrimony and the Churching of Women
 The Visitation, Anointing, and Communion of the Sick
 The Burial of the Dead, including Memorials to the Departed
 Notes on the Seasons
 The Parish Meeting and the Parish Breakfast
 Appendix I: Collects for Use in Processions and on other Occasions
 Appendix II: New and Revised Canons (1964): Section G, Things Appertaining to Churches

See also 

 Anglo-Catholicism

External links 
Online text of the first edition 1899

1899 non-fiction books
1899 in Christianity
Anglican liturgy
Anglo-Catholicism
English non-fiction books
Anglican liturgical books